Rapala arata, the Japanese flash, is a butterfly of the family Lycaenidae. It is found from Russia (Amur, Ussuri, Sakhalin and the southern Kuriles), north-eastern China, Korea and Japan. The habitat consists of brook banks, meadows and the edges of montane mixed forests.

The length of the forewings is 14–17 mm. The upperside of the wings is dark violet with a dark outer border. Adults are on wing from late May to late August in two generations in the southern part of the range. In the north, there is one generation with adults on wing in June.

The larvae feed on Fabaceae, Saxifragaceae, Ericaceae, Rhamnaceae and Fagaceae species. They mainly feed on inflorescences, buds and berries. They are attended by ants. The larvae are brownish, greenish or purple depending on the host plant. Pupation takes place in a reddish-brown pupa with dark markings. It is made on the ground among leaf litter. The species hibernates in the pupal stage.

References

Rapala (butterfly)
Butterflies described in 1861